"Want You in My Room" is a 2019 pop song by Canadian singer Carly Rae Jepsen, from her fourth studio album, Dedicated. It was written by Jepsen, Tavish Crowe, and its producer Jack Antonoff. Jepsen released a music video for the song in September, and a live version was included in her Spotify Singles EP in October 2019. "Want You in My Room" was named #32 on Rolling Stone's 50 Best Songs of 2019.

Background
"Want You in My Room" has been described as a "euphoric, Eighties synth-laden" song with "Daft Punk-like vocal effects and cheer squad vibe". The song includes sexual lyrics in which the singer invites a partner to join her in bed. Jepsen's vocal performance on the track has been noted as referencing the early work of Cyndi Lauper.

After its release, "Want You in My Room" has become a fan favourite. It has made the list of Top 50 Songs of 2019 compiled by Pitchfork readers.

Critical reception
"Want You in My Room" received acclaim from music critics. It has been described by The Independent as Dedicateds "most distinctive [song], both vocally and melodically" and Mother Jones named it the second best song on the album. NME praised the track's "brazen lyrics" and "jubilant instrumentation", and Pitchfork complimented the "scene-stealing Jack Antonoff production". Paste ranked "Want You in My Room" as one of the best songs of May 2019. The song was also selected as one of the best tracks of 2019 by a number of The Guardian journalists. In October 2022, Rachel Seo of Variety ranked the song as Jepsen's third best.

In a more negative review from Consequence of Sound, the song was criticized for the "childlike tone" paired with sexual content.

Year-end lists

Music video
The music video for the song was directed by Andrew Donoho and premiered on YouTube on September 19, 2019. It begins with Jepsen sitting in her bed, wrapping up a phone conversation with her boyfriend. She then instructs her Google Home device to set timer for an hour and starts singing the song to a hairbrush in bed. The singer walks out of the room, which is pictured surrealistically disjointed in the middle of a green space, and dances her way to a dressing table nearby where she re-applies lipstick. She then proceeds to walk in and out of another room, each time re-appearing in a different outfit and a different setting: on a beach and by the side of a swimming pool. She finally runs back to her bedroom, where she starts dancing to the music played by a band which consists of furnitures with arms. The video ends with the boyfriend knocking on the door and Carly pulling him inside by the tie.

References

2019 songs
Carly Rae Jepsen songs
Songs written by Carly Rae Jepsen
Songs written by Jack Antonoff
Song recordings produced by Jack Antonoff